Hobbs is a city in Lea County, New Mexico, United States. Its population was 40,508 at the 2020 census, increasing from 34,122 in 2010.

Hobbs is the principal city of the Hobbs, New Mexico micropolitan statistical area, which includes all of Lea County.

History
Hobbs was founded in 1907 when James Isaac Hobbs (1852–1923) established a homestead and named the settlement. In 1910, the Hobbs post office opened, with James Hobbs as the first postmaster. By 1911, about 25 landowners lived in Hobbs.

The small, isolated settlement expanded rapidly following the discovery of oil by the Midwest Oil Company in 1927. A refinery was built the following year, and in 1929, the town of Hobbs was officially incorporated. At the peak of this oil boom, over 12,000 people lived in Hobbs. When the Great Depression hit, oil prices dropped and the population fell to only about 3,000 in 1931. A few years later, though, activity picked up in the oilfields and the population climbed to about 14,000 in 1940.

On June 23, 1938, seven local men were killed and five more injured when an explosive charge used in oil drilling detonated prematurely.

Following the outbreak of World War II, Hobbs Army Airfield was built north of town in 1942. In 1948, the city bought the air base and converted it into the Hobbs Industrial Air Park, which is still used for soaring competitions.

The first college in Hobbs opened in 1956. It was initially the First Baptist College, and in 1962, it became the College of the Southwest. The name was changed again to University of the Southwest in 2008. A second college, New Mexico Junior College, opened in 1966.

An ordinance was passed in Hobbs in November 2022 to prevent abortion clinics from operating.

Geography
U.S. Routes 62/180 pass through the city, leading east  to Seminole, Texas, and west  to Carlsbad. State Road 18 also passes through Hobbs, leading northwest  to Lovington, the Lea county seat, and south  to Kermit, Texas.

Land in the city drains either east to Seminole Draw or southeast to Monument Draw, both of which are tributaries of Mustang Draw in Texas and ultimately part of the Colorado River watershed.

Climate

Hobbs, like many parts of eastern New Mexico, has a semiarid climate (Köppen climate classification BSk). The city experiences hot summers and chilly winters. With around 70% of precipitation coming in the high solar half of the year, Hobbs may also be defined as a dry-winter humid subtropical climate (Köppen climate classification Cwa).
<div style="width:65%">

</div style>

Demographics

2020 census

As of the 2020 United States Census, 40,508 people, 12,028 households, and 8,572 families resided in the city.

2010 census
As of 2010, 33,405 people, 10,040 households, and 7,369 families were residing in the city. The population density was 1,514.0 people per square mile (584.5/km). The 11,968 housing units averaged 632.3 per mi2 (244.1/km). The racial makeup of the city was 63.5% White, 6.8% African American, 1.1% Native American, 0.4% Asian, 24.5% from other races, and 3.7% from two or more races. Hispanics or Latinos of any race were 42.18% of the population.

Of the 10,040 households, 39.8% had children under 18 living with them, 54.1% were married couples living together, 14.6% had a female householder with no husband present, and 26.6% were not families. About 23.4% of all households were made up of individuals, and 10.1% had someone living alone who was 65 or older. The average household size was 2.72, and the average family size was 3.22.

In the city, the age distribution was 30.4% under 18, 10.3% from 18 to 24, 28.0% from 25 to 44, 19.4% from 45 to 64, and 11.9% who were 65 or older. The median age was 32 years. For every 100 females, there were 100.2 males. For every 100 females age 18 and over, there were 99.2 males.

The median income for a household in the city was $28,100, and for a family was $33,017. Males had a median income of $31,352 versus $20,841 for females. The per capita income for the city was $14,209. About 20.2% of families and 24.2% of the population were below the poverty line, including 32.3% of those under age 18 and 15.5% of those age 65 or over.

Economy
The largest industries in Hobbs are mining/quarrying and oil and gas extraction, followed by retail trade and educational services.  Hobbs is also home to Zia Park, a racetrack, hotel and casino with over 750 slot machines and table games.

Arts and culture

Located in Hobbs are the headquarters of the Soaring Society of America and Zia Park Casino, Hotel, and Racetrack, which offers live and simulcast racing, casino games, dining, and a 154-room hotel. The property is owned and operated by Penn National Gaming, Inc.

Transportation
Lea County Regional Airport serves Hobbs with one commercial passenger airline flying to it.

Education
 University of the Southwest is a private, four-year Christian university
 New Mexico Junior College is a public junior college

Hobbs Municipal Schools is the local school district.
 Hobbs High School

 CTECH Vocational campus

Notable people

 Tony Benford, assistant coach with TCU's men's basketball team
 Ryan Bingham, country singer/songwriter
 Bill Bridges, professional basketball player
 James O. Browning, federal judge
 Diane Denish, former lieutenant governor of New Mexico
 Tharon Drake, swimmer, U.S. Paralympic medalist 2016
 Rob Evans, former head basketball coach at the University of Mississippi and Arizona State University
 Colt McCoy, NFL quarterback 
 Steve Pearce, former Republican congressman for New Mexico's 2nd congressional district
 Guy Penrod, gospel singer
 Timmy Smith, former NFL player
 Ralph Tasker, high school basketball coach
 Jeff Taylor and son Jeffery Taylor, professional basketball players
 Harry Teague, former Democratic congressman for New Mexico's 2nd congressional district
 Scott Terry, former pitcher for the Cincinnati Reds
 Polo Urias, singer

See also

 Hobbs, Texas
 Eastern New Mexico

References

External links

Cities in New Mexico
Cities in Lea County, New Mexico
Micropolitan areas of New Mexico
Populated places established in 1907
1907 establishments in New Mexico Territory